German submarine U-972 was a Type VIIC U-boat of Nazi Germany's Kriegsmarine during World War II.

Construction 
U-972 was laid down on 15 June 1942 at the Blohm & Voss yard in Hamburg, Germany. She was launched on 22 February 1943 and commissioned on 8 April 1943 under the command of Oberleutnant zur See Klaus-Dietrich König. Her U-boat emblem was a skull with tophat.

She was assessed at  submerged. She had two shafts and two  propellers.

The submarine was fitted with five  torpedo tubes (four fitted at the bow and one at the stern), fourteen torpedoes, one  deck gun (220 rounds) and a  Flak M42 anti-aircraft gun. The boat had a complement of 44 to 57 men.

Service history
U-972 was used as a Training ship in the 5th U-boat Flotilla from 8 April 1943 until 30 November 1943 where she had been trained and tested at the individual commands (UAK, TEK, AGRU-Front, etc.) and had been part of Ausbildungsflottillen (26th U-boat Flotilla, 27th U-boat Flotilla, etc.) for remaining works and equipment, before serving in the 6th U-boat Flotilla for active service on 1 December 1943.

Wolfpacks
U-972 took part in four wolfpacks, namely:
 Coronel (15 – 17 December 1943)  
 Sylt (18 – 23 December 1943)  
 Rügen 1 (23 – 28 December 1943)  
 Rügen 2 (28 December 1943 – 1 January 1944)

Patrol and loss 
During her active service, U-972 made one patrol. She left Kiel on 30 November 1943 with 49 crew members and made her way to her operational area in the North Atlantic. Her patrol lasted 16 days before U-972 sent her last radio message on 15 December 1943 from approx. position  in the North Atlantic. The submarine was ordered to operate with several wolfpacks during the following weeks and was only reported missing on 1 February 1944 when it failed to arrive at Brest. The submarine was lost with all hands and her wreck has yet to be found.

There is much speculation surrounding the loss of the U-972, it is reported that she was sunk by one of her own circling T5 torpedoes. But now it is believed she was sunk by Allied warships. This was her first and only patrol during World War II. The real reason of her sinking is still unknown as her last resting place remains lost.

References

Bibliography

German Type VIIC submarines
U-boats commissioned in 1943
World War II submarines of Germany
Ships built in Hamburg
1943 ships
Missing U-boats of World War II
Maritime incidents in December 1943
World War II shipwrecks in the Atlantic Ocean
Ships lost with all hands
Missing submarines of World War II